Mulikat Akande-Adeola (born 11 November 1960) is a Nigerian lawyer and politician. She was elected to the Nigerian House of Representatives on the platform of the Peoples Democratic Party representing Ogbomoso North, South and Orire Constituency in the year 2007 and was reelected in 2011.

Early life and education
Mulikat Akande was born on 11 November 1960 in Kaduna, in the northern part of Nigeria to Alhaji and Alhaja Akande of the Jokodolu family. She attended St. Annes’ Primary School and Queen Amina College in Kaduna. After her secondary education, she proceeded to the College of Arts and Science, Zaria for her A levels and thereafter went to Ahmadu Bello University in 1979, where she read Law and obtained her LL.B. (Bachelor of Laws) in 1982 with second class upper. She went to the Nigeria Law School and was called to bar in 1983. She later went to the University of Lagos for her second degree in Law (Master of Laws (LL.M.)) in 1985.

She started her legal career in the banking sector where she rose to Company Secretary/Legal Adviser from 1988 to 1996. She later left to run her private legal firm, M. L. Akande and Company, from 1997 to 2007. She is currently the chair of the board of Pilot Finance Ltd.

Political career 
She forayed into politics in 1998 on the platform of the Peoples Democratic Party. In 2007, she was elected to the House of Representatives to represent Ogbomosho North, South and Orire Federal Constituency. She also served as a member of the ECOWAS Parliament from 2007 to 2011. In 2011, she contested for Speaker of the House of Representatives and became the first woman to hold the position of Majority Leader at Federal Legislative level. In 2018, she became the first woman to be nominated for Senate by PDP for the Oyo North Senatorial District.

In May 2022, she dumped the PDP for the Social Democratic Party to vie for the ticket of the Oyo North senatorial district. She left due to irreconcilable differences with governor Seyi Makinde of Oyo State whom she help emerge as governor in 2019.

Alleged threat to life 
In March 2021, she raised an alarm that her life was under threat. The minister of Youth and Sports Development, Chief Sunday Dare warned that nothing untoward must happen to her and called on governor Seyi Makinde to treat the matter with all seriousness and ensure all-round protection for her. He also called on the security agencies to rise to the occasion and see that her life was not in anyway in danger.

References 

 Peoples Democratic Party (Nigeria) politicians
Nigerian Muslims
21st-century Nigerian politicians
21st-century Nigerian women politicians
1960 births
Ahmadu Bello University alumni
Yoruba women in politics
 Social Democratic Party (Nigeria) politicians
Living people